Listed here are the 48 currently active herbaria in Oceania, organised by herbarium code, with institution name, location and collection sizes as per Index Herbariorum.

List of active herbaria

Australia

New Zealand

Elsewhere in Oceania

Oceania's largest herbaria based on collection size
The ten largest herbaria in Oceania, based on total collection size are:

References

 
Herbaria in New Zealand
Herbaria
Herbaria